Return, Reclamation, Rehabilitation (3R) is a rebel group in the northwestern part of Central African Republic.

History 

The group was formed in December 2015 to protect Fulani herders from Anti-balaka militia attacks. On 27 September 2016, they captured the town of De Gaulle (now Koui) killing at least 17 civilians. On 2 May they captured Niem in Koui sub-prefecture. On 23 September 2017, they captured Bocaranga from opposing rebel group Anti-balaka. They transferred the town over to FACA on 7 January 2019. On 21 May 2019, 3R fighters killed 46 unarmed civilians in Ouham-Pendé prefecture. On 13 July, a UN peacekeeper was killed and two others were wounded in an ambush set up by the 3R militia.

On 1 May 2020, 3R took control of Baboua, withdrawing from it four days later. On 13 May, 3R disarmed local gendarmerie seizing Besson and Koundé. On 27 May, 3R took control of Koundjili in Ouham-Pende. Local population fled to bush. On 6 June, 3R withdrew from Central African peace agreement. On 30 June, Bangladeshi paratroopers from MINUSCA attacked 3R in Koui. On 22 July, MINUSCA forces recaptured Niem from 3R forces, followed by Besson (28 July) and Koui (17 August). On 19 August, they moved its headquarters to Abba. On 17 September, they captured four villages in Bimbo sub-prefecture near Paoua. On 27 September, they took control of Boguila, followed by Nana-Bakassa on 7 October.

On 19 July 2020, they attacked the village of Ngbama near Bocaranga, kidnapping 40 people and stealing 50 million Central African francs. On 7 September, 3R kidnapped two policemen in the village of Bang near the border with Cameroon. On 27 September they kidnapped another law enforcement officer. On 5 December 3R freed three of the hostages after negotiations with MINUSCA. On 28 September 2020, 3R placed landmines on a bridge in Moumdji near Bocaranga and set up a checkpoint demanding payment for crossing the river. Rwandan peacekeepers removed them on 2 October.

3R banned voter registration for the 2020 Central African general election from taking place in Koui and Ngaoundaye. On 17 December 2020, 3R joined the Coalition of Patriots for Change.

On 7 August 2020, Abbas Sidiki, 3R's leader, was sanctioned by the United States government under Executive Order 13667 and listed in the Specially Designated Nationals and Blocked Persons List. On 2 April 2021, a statement from the 3R revealed that Abbas had died on March 25, from injuries he sustained during an attack in the town of Bossembélé in November 2020.

In October 2022, the Special Criminal Court (SPC) for the Central African Republic delivered its first verdict. This court, operational since 2018 and empowered to try crimes committed since 2003, sentenced three members of the 3R who were accused of killing 46 civilians in villages in the northwest region of the Central African Republic.

References 

Factions of the Central African Republic Civil War
Rebel groups in the Central African Republic
Rebel groups that actively control territory